Miriam Alonso Manteca (born 6 June 1970 in Ulm, West Germany) is a retired Spanish athlete who specialised in the 400 metres hurdles. She represented her country at the 1996 Summer Olympics, as well as three consecutive World Championships, starting in 1993.

Her personal best in the event is 55.45 seconds (Monachil 1996).

Competition record

References

1970 births
Living people
Spanish female hurdlers
Athletes (track and field) at the 1992 Summer Olympics
Athletes (track and field) at the 1996 Summer Olympics
Olympic athletes of Spain
Sportspeople from Ulm
World Athletics Championships athletes for Spain
Mediterranean Games silver medalists for Spain
Mediterranean Games bronze medalists for Spain
Mediterranean Games medalists in athletics
Athletes (track and field) at the 1993 Mediterranean Games
Athletes (track and field) at the 1997 Mediterranean Games
Athletes (track and field) at the 2001 Mediterranean Games
Competitors at the 1995 Summer Universiade
Competitors at the 1997 Summer Universiade